Henry George Percy, 7th Duke of Northumberland,  (29 May 1846 – 14 May 1918), styled Lord Warkworth between 1865 and 1867 and Earl Percy between 1867 and 1899, was a British Conservative politician. He served as Treasurer of the Household under Benjamin Disraeli between 1874 and 1875 and was Chairman of the National Union of Conservative and Constitutional Associations from 1879 to 1883.

Background
Percy was the eldest son of Algernon Percy, 6th Duke of Northumberland, by his wife Louisa, daughter of Henry Drummond. Lord Algernon Percy was his younger brother. He became known by the courtesy title Lord Lovaine when his grandfather succeeded in the dukedom of Northumberland in 1865 and as Earl Percy when his father succeeded in the dukedom in 1867.

Political career
Percy was returned to parliament for Northumberland North in 1868. In 1874 he was sworn of the Privy Council and appointed Treasurer of the Household under Benjamin Disraeli, a post he held until 1875. From 1879 to 1883 he was Chairman of the National Union of Conservative and Constitutional Associations. The Northumberland North seat was abolished in 1885 and Percy was not elected for another constituency. Two years later he was summoned to the House of Lords through a writ of acceleration in his father's barony of Lovaine.

From 1909 he was made an alderman on Middlesex County Council.

Civic and military appointments
Percy succeeded in the dukedom in 1899 upon his father's death and was made a Knight of the Garter the same year. He later served as Lord Lieutenant of Northumberland from 1904 until his death in 1918 and was Lord High Steward at King George V's coronation in 1911, where he bore St Edward's Crown. He was President of the Board of Governors of Durham University College of Science (in Newcastle) in 1902, and from 1913 he also served as the second Chancellor of the University of Durham.

He was President of the Guildford Agricultural Association from 1902.

He was Honorary Colonel of the 2nd Northumberland (Percy) Artillery Volunteers until it was disbanded in October 1902.

Family
Northumberland married Lady Edith Campbell, daughter of George Campbell, 8th Duke of Argyll, on 23 December 1868. They had 13 children:

Lady Louisa Elizabeth Percy (7 November 1869 – 29 November 1893), unmarried.
Lady Edith Eleanor Percy (7 November 1869 – 2 April 1937), unmarried.
Henry Algernon George Percy, Earl Percy (21 January 1871 – 30 December 1909), unmarried.
Lady Margaret Percy (30 August 1873 – 29 January 1934), unmarried.
Lady Victoria Alexandra Percy (12 February 1875 – 18 January 1958), married Sir Robert Tidmarsh. 
Hon. Josceline Percy (26 January 1876 – 31 January 1898), unmarried.
Hon. Ralph William Percy (9 March 1877 – 28 March 1889), died in childhood.
Lady Mary Percy (30 August 1878 – 18 March 1965). Married Aymer Edward Maxwell and was the mother of author and naturalist Gavin Maxwell.
Alan Ian Percy, 8th Duke of Northumberland (17 April 1880 – 23 August 1930).
Lord William Richard Percy   (17 May 1882 – 8 February 1963), married Mary Swinton, daughter of Captain George Sitwell Campbell Swinton.
Lord James Percy (6 January 1885 – 20 May 1903), died unmarried.
Eustace Sutherland Campbell Percy, 1st Baron Percy of Newcastle (21 March 1887 – 3 April 1958).
Lady Muriel Evelyn Nora Percy (14 July 1890 – 23 November 1956), unmarried.

The Duchess of Northumberland died in July 1913, aged 63. Northumberland survived her by five years and died in May 1918, aged 71.

References

External links 
 

|-

1846 births
1918 deaths
Fellows of the Royal Society
Chancellors of Durham University
307
Knights of the Garter
Lord High Stewards
Lord-Lieutenants of Northumberland
Percy, Henry Percy, Earl Percy
Members of the Privy Council of the United Kingdom
Percy, Henry Percy, Earl Percy
Percy, Henry Percy, Earl Percy
Percy, Henry Percy, Earl Percy
Northumberland, D7
Henry Percy, 07th Duke of Northumberland
Treasurers of the Household
British landowners
Members of Middlesex County Council
19th-century British businesspeople
Surtees Society
Presidents of the Royal Archaeological Institute